Torpa Assembly constituency   is an assembly constituency in  the Indian state of Jharkhand. Paulus Surin of JMM defeated Koche Munda of BJP by just 43 votes in 2014 Assembly Election.

Members of Legislative Assembly
2005: Koche Munda, Bharatiya Janata Party
2009: Paulus Surin, Jharkhand Mukti Morcha
2014: Paulus Surin, Jharkhand Mukti Morcha
2019: Koche Munda, Bharatiya Janata Party

See also
Vidhan Sabha
List of states of India by type of legislature

References

Assembly constituencies of Jharkhand